Shujaul Mulik was elected to represent Kunar Province in Afghanistan's Wolesi Jirga, the lower house of its National Legislature, in 2005.

A report on Kunar prepared at the Navy Postgraduate School stated that he had been a refugee in Pakistan.
It stated that he was a high school graduate who had run a free clinic .
It stated he sat on the internal security committee.

His ruling time witnessed peace and stability and he introduced appealing changes to his people

References

Politicians of Kunar Province
Living people
Members of the House of the People (Afghanistan)
Year of birth missing (living people)